The Goliath GV800 was a light freight truck built in the early 1950s in Bremen, Germany. It also was available as panel van and reached up to 37 mph (60 km/h). It was announced in March 1951.

The starter battery and electric was 6 volts only. Due performance the 16 hp engine was upgraded to 21 hp and the improved vehicle was sold as modell GV800A.

It was a four wheeler in parallel production of the three-wheeler freight carts, at this time the Goliath GD750, increasing those maximum freight load 750 kg to 800 kg.

The Goliath GV800A was the engine improved successor of the GV800, now reaching a top speed of 47 mph (75 km/h).

This version had a weak construction of the frame and that adequate reliably mirrored in Bordward's reputation. The frame was not reworked or redesigned, but the production was stopped and the produced vehicles were sold off.

The sales price per vehicle was 5425 to 6425 DM per body variation. 

Including the predecessor, a total of 4016 vehicles were built.

Competitors 
 VW T1
Very similar looking competitors were:
 Tempo Matador / Wiking
 Gutbrod Atlas

References

External links
 List of remaining Goliath vehicles , retrieved February 2019

GV 800
Rear-wheel-drive vehicles
Vehicles introduced in 1951
Minibuses
Vans
Minivans
Pickup trucks
Cab over vehicles
Cars introduced in 1951